Black Leather Jesus is a harsh noise wall group originally from Houston, Texas. The group was founded by Richard Ramirez in 1989, who fronts the band alongside partner Sean E. Matzus and various other musicians assisting. At one point, the band had 14 members. The group's themes focus on S&M and the gay leather subculture. It was inspired by the kidnapping of Colleen Stan.

Black Leather Jesus opened for Sonic Youth in Marfa, Texas in 2007. Black Leather Jesus has done releases with Merzbow, Incapacitants, Blue Sabbath Black Cheer, The Haters and M.S.B.R. among several others. The band is presently based near Pittsburgh, Pennsylvania.

References

External links
Black Leather Jesus discography

American noise rock music groups
Musical groups from Houston
LGBT-themed musical groups
BDSM-related mass media
1989 establishments in Texas